Snaafi Dancer (foaled February 25, 1982) is a Thoroughbred racehorse who was the first yearling to sell for more than US$10 million ($ million in current dollars).

Breeding
Bred by Donald T. Johnson  under the name of his Crescent Farm, he was out of the mare My Bupers and sired by Northern Dancer whom the National Thoroughbred Racing Association calls "one of the most influential sires in Thoroughbred history."  Snaafi Dancer joins nine other descendants of Northern Dancer who clinch the entire list of the ten most expensive colts sold at auction (current to 2014).

His dam, My Bupers, had previously produced several winners including the American Champion Sprint Horse My Juliet and the Champagne Stakes winner Lyphard's Special.

Sale
Sent to the 1983 Keeneland Select Sale, bidding opened on the yearling at $1 million, passed the previous record forty-five seconds later with a bid price of $4.5 million, and finally closed at a new record price of $10.2 million to Sheikh Mohammed's Aston Upthorpe Stud.  Looking for a Northern Dancer horse that could be a foundation stallion for his breeding operations – as had happened with chief rival Coolmore Stud – Sheikh Mohammed not only paid a new highest price ever for a yearling, but the highest price for any thoroughbred  ever sold at auction at that time.

Career
Snaafi Dancer never raced. It was reported that he was so slow in training that it would have been embarrassing to run him in public. He was retired to stud duty where he was discovered to have fertility problems. From two years of breeding, he sired only four foals, three of which raced with very limited success. Snaafi Dancer was last reported as being at a farm in Florida.

Pedigree

References

1982 racehorse births
Racehorses bred in Kentucky
Racehorses trained in the United Kingdom
Thoroughbred family 6-a